The 2011 Bayelsa State House of Assembly election was held on April 26, 2011, to elect members of the Bayelsa State House of Assembly in Nigeria. All the 24 seats were up for election in the Bayelsa State House of Assembly.

Nestor Binabo from PDP representing Sagbama II constituency was elected Speaker, while Fini Angaye from PDP representing Kolokuma/Opokuma II constituency was elected Deputy Speaker.

Results 
The result of the election is listed below.

 Dorgu Kuroakegha from PDP won Southern Ijaw I constituency
 Monday Bubou Edwin from PDP won Southern Ijaw II constituency
 Igali Baraladei from PDP won Southern Ijaw III constituency
 Kombowei Benson from PDP won Southern Ijaw IV constituency
 Victor Sam-Ateki from PDP won Brass I constituency
 Yousuo Amalanyo from PDP won Brass II constituency
 Abraham Ingobere from KOWA won Brass III constituency
 Akpe Peter from PDP won Sagbama I constituency
 Nestor Binabo from PDP won Sagbama II constituency
 Ebamua Empere from PDP won Sagbama III constituency
 Tonye Isenah from LP won Kolokuma/Opokuma I constituency
 Fini Angaye from PDP won Kolokuma/Opokuma II constituency
 Agatha Akpobo-Ere Goma from PDP won Ekeremor I constituency
 Omonibeke Kemelayefa from PDP won Ekeremor II constituency
 Victor Prezi from PPA won Ekeremor III constituency
 Azibola Paul Omekwe from PDP won Ogbia I constituency
 Obedient Prank Omoto from PDP won Ogbia II constituency
 Walamam Samuel Igrubia from PDP won Ogbia III constituency
 Alfred Egba from PDP won Yenagoa I constituency
 Fekoweimo Ebipadei from PDP won Yenagoa II constituency
 Emelah Gentle from PDP won Yenagoa III constituency
 Obuebite R. Jonathan from PDP won Nembe I constituency
 Ayobegha James from PDP won Nembe II constituency
 Obiene Iniyobiyo from PDP won Nembe III constituency

References 

House of Assembly
Bayelsa State House of Assembly elections
Bayelsa